Volodymyr Yaroslavovych Tymofiychuk (born 17 February 1986) is a Ukrainian farmer and politician currently serving as a People's Deputy of Ukraine from Ukraine's 89th electoral district as a member of Servant of the People since 29 August 2019.

Early life and career 
In 2008, he graduated from Chernivtsi University as an economist, specialising in accounting and audit. The same year, he began working in business. In 2018, he founded Ahro-Lider PE, an agricultural company specialising in the grain industry.

People's Deputy of Ukraine 
Tymofiychuk ran in the 2019 Ukrainian parliamentary election as the candidate of Servant of the People for People's Deputy of Ukraine in Ukraine's 89th electoral district. At the time of the election, he was a member of Servant of the People. Tymofiychuk was successfully elected, defeating independent candidate Dmytro Siredzhuk as well as incumbent People's Deputy  of the Ukrainian Democratic Alliance for Reform with 18.20% of the vote compared to Siredzhuk's 17.67% and Solovey's 14.83%.

In the Verkhovna Rada (Ukraine's parliament) Tymofiychuk joined the Servant of the People faction, as well as the Verkhovna Rada Committee on Agricultural and Land Policies. In March 2020, Tymofiychuk was among the People's Deputies to indicate their opposition to a proposal by the Trilateral Contact Group on Ukraine to establish an advisory council including separatists in an attempt to mediate an end to the War in Donbas. However, he later deleted the Facebook post which expressed his opposition.

References 

1986 births
Living people
Ninth convocation members of the Verkhovna Rada
People from Ivano-Frankivsk Oblast
Servant of the People (political party) politicians